The 2007 Eastern Creek round of the V8 Supercar Championship was the fifth round of the Australian 2007 V8 Supercar Championship Series. It took place on the weekend of the 9 to 11 June at Eastern Creek Raceway in New South Wales.

External links
 Official Eastern Creek Raceway website

Eastern Creek
Motorsport at Eastern Creek Raceway